Wisdom Kaye ( Uduebor) is a Nigerian-American model and TikTok personality known for his fashion-related videos. As such, Vogue considers him "TikTok's best-dressed guy".

Early life and career  
Kaye was born in Nigeria and moved to Houston, Texas when he was four years old. He became interested in fashion in high school and was influenced by French fashion designer Hedi Slimane, whom at the time was creative director of Yves Saint Laurent and is currently creative director of Celine. Kaye went to Fulshear High School and is now a student at Texas State University. Kaye was scouted by IMG Models via their social media team and made his debut at Balmain for their S/S 2022 fashion show. He has also worked with Dior, Fendi, Ralph Lauren, Coach New York, and Revlon.

On TikTok, Kaye joined in January 2020 and went viral for his take on the "Vogue Challenge"; by July 2020, he had reached 2 million followers. He also went viral for creating high-fashion outfits based on Marvel Cinematic Universe characters. In December 2021, he was featured on Teen Vogue's 21 Under 21 list.

References 

Living people
2001 births
American TikTokers
People from Houston
American male models
African-American male models
IMG Models models
Texas State University alumni
American people of Nigerian descent